Ministry of Telecommunications & Information Technology (Arabic: وزارة الإتصالات وتقنية المعلومات   ) is a cabinet ministry of Yemen.

List of ministers 

 Najib al-Awj (17 December 2020 – present)
 Lutfi Bashuraif (2014–2020)

See also 

 Politics of Yemen

References 

Government ministries of Yemen